Richmond Community College is a public community college in Hamlet, North Carolina. It serves residents of Richmond and Scotland counties. The college is part of the North Carolina Community College System.

Campuses 
Richmond Community College maintains a satellite campus in Scotland County.

Academics
The RichmondCC Guarantee provides free college to any incoming student with a 3.0 GPA and 2 college classes.

References

External links
 Official website

North Carolina Community College System colleges
Education in Richmond County, North Carolina
Educational institutions established in 1967
1967 establishments in North Carolina
Two-year colleges in the United States